Adrian Frederick Smith (born 27 February 1957) is an English guitarist best known as a member of heavy metal band Iron Maiden, for whom he also writes songs and performs backing vocals both live and in the studio.

Smith grew up in London and became interested in rock music at 15. He soon formed a friendship with future Iron Maiden guitarist Dave Murray, who inspired him to take up the guitar. After leaving school at 16, he formed the band Urchin, which he led until their demise in 1980. He joined Iron Maiden in November 1980, replacing Dennis Stratton. Following a short-lived solo project called ASAP, he left Iron Maiden in 1990 and, after a year-long hiatus, formed the band The Untouchables which later became Psycho Motel. In 1997, Psycho Motel was put on hold when Smith joined the band of former Iron Maiden singer Bruce Dickinson. Smith and Dickinson would both return to Iron Maiden in 1999, after which the band gained new success. During his second tenure with Iron Maiden, Smith has also led the side projects Primal Rock Rebellion and Smith/Kotzen.

Biography

Early years and Urchin: 1957–1980
Born in Hackney, Smith grew up in Clapton. He purchased his first record, Deep Purple's Machine Head, at the age of 15. This led him to befriend Dave Murray, with whom he formed a band called Stone Free, which comprised Murray on guitar, Smith on vocals and their friend Dave McCloughlin playing the bongos. 

After seeing the attention Murray received from girls, Smith took up the guitar, starting with an old Spanish guitar once owned by his brother, before purchasing an old guitar of Murray's for £5. His early influences included Johnny Winter and Pat Travers, which he claims made him a "melodic player" rather than a "speed merchant or a shredder" as he "was inspired by blues rock rather than metal."

Leaving school after completing his O-levels, Smith formed the band Evil Ways, including Dave Murray on guitar, which was later renamed Urchin. Smith began writing his own material, including a song called "Countdown," which evolved into "22 Acacia Avenue", later included on Iron Maiden's The Number of the Beast (1982). For a period of 2 years, Smith had a job as a Water Bailiff and Fisheries Officer at the Walthamstow Reservoirs.

Murray left Urchin to join Iron Maiden. Urchin then signed with DJM Records and released a single, "Black Leather Fantasy", in 1977. Shortly afterwards, Murray rejoined Urchin on their next single, "She's a Roller", as he had been sacked from Iron Maiden after an argument with singer Dennis Wilcock, although he would be reinstated six months later. Smith was also offered a place in Iron Maiden while they were in the process of signing with EMI in 1979, but turned them down to continue with his own band, a decision he later regretted as Urchin split up in 1980.

First tenure in Iron Maiden: 1980–1990

Shortly after Urchin split, Smith encountered Steve Harris and Dave Murray on a street in his neighborhood, and the two asked him to reconsider joining Iron Maiden as the replacement for guitarist Dennis Stratton. This time Smith accepted the offer, and debuted with the band on a West German TV show Rockpop in Concert in Munich on 8 November 1980, before setting out on a UK tour and recording the Killers album, released in 1981. Smith's first song-writing contributions appeared on The Number of the Beast, co-penning "Gangland" and "The Prisoner", as well as the previously mentioned "22 Acacia Avenue", after which he began co-writing many songs with singer Bruce Dickinson, on the following Piece of Mind album.

Smith and Dave Murray combined playing dual lead guitars, creating what AllMusic calls "the most formidable twin-guitar attack in heavy metal, outside of Glenn Tipton and K. K. Downing." Smith, along with Steve Harris, also provides the band's backing vocals, and sang lead on "Reach Out", the B-side to the "Wasted Years" single, featuring Bruce Dickinson on backing vocals. Originally written by guitarist Dave "Bucket" Colwell, with whom he had worked on The Entire Population of Hackney project, Smith would later sing "Reach Out" again for Colwell's solo album, Guitars, Beers & Tears, released in 2010.

Departure from Iron Maiden and other projects: 1989–1999
While Iron Maiden were taking some time off in 1989, Smith released a solo LP with the band ASAP (Adrian Smith And Project), entitled Silver and Gold, which was a commercial failure in spite of a promotional club tour. Unhappy with the direction the band were taking for their next release, No Prayer for the Dying, and feeling that he could not help enough in the creative work, Smith left Iron Maiden in 1990 during the album's pre-production stages, and was replaced by Janick Gers. After releasing the more progressive Somewhere in Time and Seventh Son of a Seventh Son albums in 1986 and 1988 respectively, Steve Harris had decided that the band should go for a "stripped-down" and "street level" approach, which Smith thought was a "step backward." No Prayer for the Dying contained one last Smith song, co-penned with Bruce Dickinson, entitled "Hooks in You".

After leaving, Smith started a family with his Canadian wife, Nathalie, and would not play guitar again until he joined Iron Maiden onstage at Donington Park in 1992 to "Running Free". That performance appeared on the live album Live at Donington. In the same year, after hearing King's X for the first time, he decided that he would "love to play in a band like that" and formed The Untouchables, which later became Psycho Motel. The band recorded two albums, State of Mind in 1995 and Welcome to the World in 1997, during which they supported Iron Maiden on the British leg of The X Factour. The project was put on hold, however, when Smith joined Bruce Dickinson for his 1997 album, Accident of Birth, after which he became a full-time member of Dickinson's solo outfit, embarking on two world tours and contributing to one further studio release, 1998's The Chemical Wedding.

Return to Iron Maiden: 1999–present

In 1999, Smith rejoined Iron Maiden, along with vocalist Bruce Dickinson, who commented, "When he left the band in 1990, I think everybody was a bit surprised at how much we missed him and certainly, I don't think anybody had realized how much the fans would miss him – big time. I wouldn't have rejoined Iron Maiden if he wasn't in the band. I just don't think it would have been complete without Adrian, and now, it's great having three guitarists." The band embarked on a short tour, after which the new line-up's first album, Brave New World, was recorded with producer Kevin Shirley and released in 2000.

He remains in Iron Maiden, with whom he has released five further studio albums, 2003's Dance of Death, 2006's A Matter of Life and Death, 2010's The Final Frontier, 2015's The Book of Souls and 2021's Senjutsu. Smith claims that his guitar playing improved after leaving the band in 1990, in particular while working with Roy Z, from whom he "learned a lot about picking" and became "more disciplined." Since returning to Iron Maiden, he has also continued experimenting with tuning (which he began doing in Psycho Motel), stating that he has used drop D tuning in live renditions of "Run to the Hills", "Wrathchild", "The Trooper" and "Hallowed Be Thy Name". Although Smith had previously been known to contribute shorter, more "commercial" tracks, since his return to the band he has penned many longer songs, beginning with "Paschendale" from Dance of Death.

Side projects
In 2011, Smith formed the side project Primal Rock Rebellion with Mikee Goodman. They released the album, Awoken Broken, in February 2012. In 2020, Smith collaborated with Richie Kotzen under the name Smith/Kotzen. Ultimate Classic Rock described the project's sound as a mixture of blues, traditional R&B, and hard rock. A video for teaser track, "Taking My Chances", debuted in January 2021. Their self-titled debut album was released in March 2021.

Personal life
Adrian Smith was born in Hackney Hospital and grew up a few streets away from his childhood friend, and current bandmate, Dave Murray. Smith, whose father was a painter and decorator from Homerton, was the youngest of three, with an older brother, Patrick, and a sister, Kathleen. As a child, he was "a Manchester United fanatic," although he would lose his interest in football once he got into music.

In his spare time, Smith is a keen angler, revealing that he used to take "worms and maggots" with him on tour, and was featured on the front cover of Angler's Mail on 25 August 2009. Since 21 October 1988, he has been married to his Canadian wife, Nathalie Dufresne-Smith, who currently works for Maiden Flight, a cancer awareness/patient rights organisation, and the pair have three children, Dylan, Natasha, and Brittany, the last of whom works as a professional film production assistant.

In April 2020, ironmaiden.com announced Smith's autobiography titled Monsters of River and Rock would be released in September 2020. The book primarily details Smith's love of fishing, and relates anecdotes from his many decades of pursuing the hobby whilst touring and recording with Iron Maiden. Smith stated that around 70% of his book was focused upon fishing, with the remaining content discussing his music career. In its review of the publication, MetalTalk described the book as "a prize catch amongst rock biographies – highly recommended."

Equipment

Guitars

Smith currently prefers to use his Jackson signature 'San Dimas' Dinky, although he has used a variety of guitars over his career, including several different Dean models, various Jacksons, including the Randy Rhoads model, Fender Stratocasters (including three Fender Floyd Rose Classic Stratocasters; one with an added Roland midi pick-up), Gibson Les Pauls, Gibson Explorers, Gibson SGs, an Ibanez Destroyer, a Hamer Scarab, and Lado Guitars. On the A Matter of Life and Death DVD, he says the first decent guitar he bought was a Deluxe Gold Top 1972 Gibson Les Paul, which he paid £235 for when he was 17, in 1974. He still uses it to this day, stating that "it's still probably the best guitar I've got".

As of 2010, his touring guitars included: Gibson Les Paul Deluxe Goldtop 1972 with DiMarzio Super Distortion in bridge position, his Jackson Superstrat 1986 prototype (which can be seen in the Maiden England video) with the pickguard changed to resemble his signature model, a Jackson Signature model with black scratchplate and maple neck, an early 70s Gibson SG, and another Jackson, inspired by his Les Paul Goldtop.

As of August 2007, Smith endorses Jackson Guitars, his first guitar company endorsement in over fifteen years. With Jackson he has released two signature models, a San Dimas Dinky and an SDX. Prior to his endorsement, he was seen using other Jackson guitars, such as a King V during his time in Bruce Dickinson's solo band, before he went to Fender guitars. In August 2008, he had a Jackson guitar stolen from backstage at a show in Greece.

Effects, controllers and processors
 Dunlop Uni-vibe Wah Controller
 Dunlop Cry Baby Wah
 Yamaha MFC10 Midi Foot Controller
 DigiTech Whammy Pedal
 DigiTech Eric Clapton Crossroads
 Two Ibanez TS-808 Tube Screamers
 Duesenberg Channel 2 overdrive/distortion
 Mike Hill B.I.S. Isolation hole
 Lexicon MX200 multi-effects unit
 Boss DD-3 Digital Delay
 Boss CH-1 Super Chorus
 Boss CS-3 Compression Sustainer

Amplifiers
 Two 300-Watt Marshall 1960A Angled-Front 4x12 Cabs loaded with 75-Watt Celestion G12-T75 Speakers
 Two Marshall 30th Anniversary 6100LM 100-Watt All-Tube Heads
 Two Marshall DSL100 JCM2000 Amplifiers
 Marshall 9200 Rack Power Amp
 Marshall JVM410H
 Blackstar Series One 104EL34
 Blackstar Series One 1046L6
 Blackstar HT-5

Units and tuners
 Shure U4 Wireless Receiver
 Whirlwind Multi-Selector 4-Channel Selector
 Dunlop DCR-1SR Rack Wah
 Peavey Tubefex Tube Preamp & Multi-Fx Unit
 Marshall JMP-1 Valve Midi Preamp
 ADA MP-1 Valve Midi Preamp, T.C Electronic 2290 Delay with Marshall 9000 series valve power amps during "Ed Hunter" and "Brave New World" Tours (1999-2001)

Discography

Urchin
 "Black Leather Fantasy" (1977)
 "She's A Roller" (1977)
 Urchin (2004) – Best of/Compilation

Iron Maiden

 Killers (1981)
 The Number of the Beast (1982)
 Piece of Mind (1983)
 Powerslave (1984)
 Somewhere in Time (1986)
 Seventh Son of a Seventh Son (1988)
 Brave New World (2000)
 Dance of Death (2003)
 A Matter of Life and Death (2006)
 The Final Frontier (2010)
 The Book of Souls (2015)
Senjutsu (2021)

A.S.A.P.
 Silver and Gold (1989)
Psycho Motel
 State of Mind (1995)
 Welcome to the World (1997)

Bruce Dickinson

 Accident of Birth (1997)
 The Chemical Wedding (1998)

Primal Rock Rebellion
Awoken Broken (2012)

Smith/Kotzen
 Smith/Kotzen (2021)

Guest appearances
 Earthshaker – Earthshaker (1983) – "Dark Angels (Animals)" (writing credits only)
 Obús – El que más (1984) – "Alguien" (writing credits only)
 Hear 'n Aid – "Stars" (1985)
 Iron Maiden – Live at Donington (1992) – "Running Free"
 Michael Kiske – Instant Clarity (1996) – "The Calling", "New Horizons", "Hunted"
 Humanary Stew: A Tribute to Alice Cooper (also released as: Welcome to Nightmare: An All-Star Salute To Alice Cooper) (1998) – "Black Widow"
 Dave Colwell – Guitars, Beers & Tears (2010) – Lead vocals on "Reach Out", lead vocals and lead guitar on "Make Up Your Mind"
 Kym Mazelle – Destiny (2010) – Writer, producer, guitar, bass and backing vocals on "My Shoes"
 The Royal Philharmonic Orchestra Plays the Music of Rush (2012) – "Red Barchetta"
 Celtic Pride – Light Up The Sky (2012) – Guitar solo on "The Patriot"

Notes

References

Literature

External links

 
 
 

1957 births
20th-century British guitarists
20th-century English composers
20th-century English male singers
21st-century British guitarists
21st-century English composers
21st-century English male singers
ASAP (band) members
Bertelsmann Music Group artists
Capitol Records artists
Castle Communications artists
CMC International artists
Columbia Records artists
DJM Records artists
EMI Records artists
English heavy metal guitarists
English heavy metal singers
English male guitarists
English rock guitarists
English rock singers
Enigma Records artists
Harvest Records artists
Iron Maiden members
Rhythm guitarists
Living people
Musicians from London
Parlophone artists
People from Hackney Central
Lead guitarists
Sanctuary Records artists
Spinefarm Records artists
Victor Entertainment artists